Alexandru Irinel Mățan (born 29 August 1999) is a Romanian professional footballer who plays as an attacking midfielder or a winger for Major League Soccer club Columbus Crew.

Club career

Viitorul Constanța
An academy graduate of Viitorul Constanța, Mățan made his Liga I debut on 6 May 2016, aged 16. He entered as a 63rd-minute substitute for Ciprian Perju and converted a penalty kick in the 3–3 away draw at Dinamo București.

Mățan made his first appearance in European competitions on 12 July 2018, starting in a 2–0 away win over Luxembourgish team Racing FC in the first qualifying round of the UEFA Europa League.

On 6 July 2019, Mățan played the full 90 minutes in a 1–0 victory over CFR Cluj for the season's Supercupa României. He was then sent on a one-season loan to fellow league club Voluntari, amassing 25 games and netting once during his stint.

Columbus Crew
On 8 March 2021, Mățan joined American team Columbus Crew in a transfer rumoured to be worth around €1.5 million. He made his Major League Soccer debut on 18 April, coming on as an 88th-minute substitute for Pedro Santos in a goalless draw with Philadelphia Union.

Mățan registered his first CONCACAF Champions League game 11 days later, a 2–2 home draw with Mexican side Monterrey. He totalled 30 matches in all competitions during his first season in Ohio, starting in only nine of them and failing to score.

Loan to Rapid București
After falling down the pecking order at Columbus Crew and featuring for the reserve team, Mățan was sent on a five-month loan to Rapid București on 9 August 2022. He made his debut for "the White-Burgundies" four days later, in a 0–1 away derby loss to Petrolul Ploiești. 

On 23 December 2022, it was announced that Mățan's loan ended, with the player having made only six appearances due to a stress fracture suffered on his toe.

International career
On 21 March 2018, Mățan scored twice for the Romania national under-19 team in a 4–0 victory over Serbia at the Ilie Oană Stadium in Ploiești.

In 2021, Mățan featured for the under-21 side in the UEFA European Championship. He made three appearances in the eventual group-stage exit, and contributed with the equaliser in a 2–1 win against hosts Hungary on 27 March.

Career statistics

Club

Honours
Viitorul Constanța
Cupa României: 2018–19
Supercupa României: 2019; runner-up: 2017

Columbus Crew
 Campeones Cup: 2021

References

External links

1999 births
Living people
Sportspeople from Galați
Romanian footballers
Association football midfielders
Association football wingers
Liga I players
Major League Soccer players
MLS Next Pro players
FC Viitorul Constanța players
FC Voluntari players
FC Rapid București players
Columbus Crew players
Columbus Crew 2 players
Romania youth international footballers
Romania under-21 international footballers
Romanian expatriate footballers
Expatriate soccer players in the United States
Romanian expatriate sportspeople in the United States